Arleta station is a light rail station on the Muni Metro T Third Street line in the Visitacion Valley neighborhood of San Francisco, California on the south slope of Candlestick Hill. The station opened with the T Third Street line on January 13, 2007. It has a single island platform located in the median of Bayshore Boulevard between Arleta Avenue and Blanken Avenue, with access from crosswalks at both streets. 

References

External links 

SFMTA: Bayshore Blvd & Arleta/Blanken northbound, southbound
SF Bay Transit (unofficial): Bay Shore Blvd/Arleta/Blanken

Muni Metro stations
Railway stations in the United States opened in 2007